A ploutonion (lit. "Place of Plouton") is a sanctuary specially dedicated to the ancient Greek god Plouton (i.e., Hades). Only a few such shrines are known from classical sources, usually at locations that produce poisonous emissions and were considered to represent an entrance to the underworld.

 At Eleusis, the ploutonion was near the north entrance to the sacred district (temenos). It was built by Peisistratos in the 6th century BC and rebuilt two centuries later, when the Eleusinian mysteries were at the height of their influence. The cave was the traditional site of the birth of the Divine Child Ploutos.
 The Greek geographer Strabo mentioned three sites as having a ploutonion. One was on a hill between Tralleis and Nysa. Its precinct encompassed a sacred grove, a temple dedicated to Plouton and Persephone, and an adjoining cave called the Charonion, after the ferryman of the dead. According to Strabo, it "possesses some singular physical properties" and served as a shrine for healing and a dream oracle (incubation).

 Pluto's Gate, the ploutonion at Phrygian Hierapolis (modern Pamukkale in Turkey), was connected to the local cult of Cybele. Inhaling its vapors was said to be lethal to all living things except the Galli, the goddess's eunuch priests. During the Roman Imperial era, the cult of Apollo subsumed existing religious sites there, including the ploutonion. Archaeological excavations in the 1960s showed that the ploutonion had been located within the sacred precinct of Apollo: "it consisted of a natural opening along a wall of travertine, leading to a grotto in which streams of hot water gushed forth to release a noxious exhalation". This site was also associated with a dream oracle; the Neoplatonist Damascius dreamed that he was Attis in the company of the Great Mother.
 Strabo further records that Lake Avernus in Italy had been taken as a ploutonion because the gases it produced were so noxious that they overwhelmed birds flying overhead. According to earlier sources, he says, this was the oracle of the dead (nekumanteion) sought by Odysseus in Book 11 of the Odyssey; Strabo, however, seems not to have himself regarded Avernus as a ploutonion.
 There was a Ploutonion at Acharaca.

See also
 Avernus
 Gates of Hell
 Pluto's Gate (the ploutonion at Hierapolis)
 Thermopylae
 Necromanteion of Acheron

References

Ancient Greek religion
Eleusinian Mysteries
Greek underworld